Sarah Jane Campbell  (born July 19, 1982) is a politician in Ontario, Canada. She was a New Democratic member of the Legislative Assembly of Ontario who represented the riding of Kenora—Rainy River from 2011 to 2018.

Background
Campbell was born in Atikokan, and raised in Atikokan, Thunder Bay and Ear Falls, where her father owns a tourist camp. Campbell lives in Vermilion Bay with her family. She was the riding assistant to former NDP leader Howard Hampton.

Politics
Campbell ran in the 2011 provincial election as the New Democratic candidate in the riding of Kenora—Rainy River. She defeated Progressive Conservative candidate Rod McKay by 2,642 votes. She was re-elected in the 2014 provincial election defeating PC candidate Randy Nickle by 6,967 votes.

She was the party's critic for women's issues and aboriginal affairs.

In November 2017, Campbell announced that she would not seek a third term and would be leaving politics.

Election results

References

External links

1982 births
Living people
Ontario New Democratic Party MPPs
People from Kenora District
People from Rainy River District
Women MPPs in Ontario
21st-century Canadian politicians
21st-century Canadian women politicians